Union Station is a historic former railroad station located in downtown Palmer, Massachusetts. The building, which was designed by American architect H. H. Richardson, opened in June 1884 to consolidate two separate stations nearby. The grounds of the station were originally designed by Frederick Law Olmsted.

It is located at the junction of the Boston and Albany Railroad (later part of the New York Central Railroad, and now the CSX Boston Subdivision), the New London Northern Railroad (later the Central Vermont Railway, now the New England Central Railroad), and the Ware River Railroad (later under the New York Central, and now operated by the Massachusetts Central Railroad).

History

Three railroads
The Western Railroad opened from Worcester to Springfield, Massachusetts in 1839, and on to Albany, New York in 1841. In 1867, it joined with the Boston and Worcester Railroad to form the Boston and Albany Railroad. The B&A had a station, similar in design to the extant station at West Brookfield, located on the north side of its tracks near the modern station site.

The New London, Willimantic, and Palmer Railroad opened to Palmer in September 1850. It was extended to Amherst in May 1853 by the NLW&P-leased Amherst and Belchertown Railroad. After several reorganizations, they were combined as the New London Northern Railroad in 1864, which itself was leased by the Vermont Central Railroad in 1871 then the Central Vermont Railway in 1873. The NLN station was located on the southwestern side of its tracks, opposite the modern station location.

The Ware River Railroad opened from Palmer to Gilbertville in 1870; it was operated by the New London Northern (with which it shared a right of way north of Palmer) in 1871 and the Vermont Central Railroad until April 1873 when it was bought by the B&A. The line was completed to Winchendon that November.

Union Station

In August 1881, the B&A and the NLN hired architect H. H. Richardson to design a union station for both railroads to use. The design was complicated by the narrow angle at which the railroads intersected. W.N. Flynt & Company started work in May 1883 and the station opened in June 1884. It was built of granite from Flynt's quarry (which had its own branch off the NLN in Monson) and trimmed with brownstone from Longmeadow. The station, including a small baggage room which is no longer extant, cost $53,616. Its grounds were designed by Frederick Law Olmsted; little of this landscaping remains.

End of passenger service
The Central Vermont became part of the Grand Trunk Railway in 1899, which in turn was nationalized by the Canadian government in 1922. Passenger service on the line ended on September 27, 1947. A mixed train was operated on the Ware River until 1948.

The B&A was acquired by the New York Central Railroad in 1900. Local service was operated until April 24, 1960, after which only Palmer, Springfield, Pittsfield, and Albany remained stops west of Worcester. A single round trip continued to serve Palmer under the NYC and Penn Central until April 30, 1971; Amtrak declined to continue the route when it took over operations the next day. Amtrak Bay State, Inland Route, Montrealer (train), Vermonter, and Lake Shore Limited service since then have not stopped at Palmer.

Revival
The three lines continue to see freight service. The Central Vermont was sold to RailTex in 1995 and operated as the New England Central Railroad. RailTex was merged into RailAmerica in 2000, which in turn was acquired by the Genesee & Wyoming company in 2012. The B&A is now the CSX Boston Subdivision, while parts of the Ware River railroad are operated by the Massachusetts Central Railroad.

The station building housed a flea market for many years, and a section of canopy was removed in the 1980s. It was bought by new private owners in 1987, and added to the National Register of Historic Places in 1988. The freight house was torn down by Conrail in 1989. The Steaming Tender Restaurant, which caters to railfans observing busy rail traffic, opened in 2004.

Restored rail service to Palmer has been proposed. Early proposals for East-West Rail indicate a new passenger station in Palmer; however, it is currently undetermined if the former station site would be restored for the new Boston-to-Pittsfield service. The Central Corridor Rail Line would run on the NECR, while increased Boston-Springfield frequencies on CSX have been proposed by the state.

References

External links

Boston & Albany Railroad Station, Palmer, Hampden County, MA - Library of Congress
Union Station on Google Maps Street View
Steaming Tender Restaurant

Former railway stations in Massachusetts
Railway stations in Hampden County, Massachusetts
Railway stations on the National Register of Historic Places in Massachusetts
Palmer, Massachusetts
Palmer, Massachusetts
Richardsonian Romanesque architecture in Massachusetts
Henry Hobson Richardson buildings
Railway stations in the United States opened in 1884
National Register of Historic Places in Hampden County, Massachusetts
Grand Trunk Railway stations in New England